The Reunion (顶天立地) is Singaporean drama which aired on MediaCorp Channel 8 in December 2001. It was written by acclaimed award-winning script writer Ang Eng Tee, who went on to produce popular dramas such as Holland V and The Little Nyonya.

Cast
Chew Chor Meng as Lee Ke Chun (Li Kechun)
Terence Cao as Tan Guan Kun (Chen Guanjun)
Tay Ping Hui as Lau Ah Chow (Liu Yazhou)
Carole Lin as Diana Lau
Yvonne Lim as Lu Xiuwen
Wong Li-lin as Choo Yu Hang (Zhu Yuhang)
Joey Swee as Long Mingzhu
Michelle Liow as Wang Xiaoyang
Huang Wenyong as Steven Choo
Hong Huifang as Anne Yeo
Andrea De Cruz as Seow Luolin
Nick Shen
Koh Chieng Mun as Mrs Tan Shuilian
Henry Thia as Huang Feihong
Lin Yisheng as Ah Dong
Pan Chao'an as Thai Pa

Plot
The series traces the lives of three friends played by Tay Ping Hui, Terence Cao and Chew Chor Meng and chronicles the ups and downs of their lives. Their friendship is however put to the test under the onslaught of greed, love, jealousy, hatred and betrayal.

On Christmas Eve 1999, famous lawyer Lee Ke Chun (Chew Chor Meng) hosts a Christmas party for the societal elite at his bungalow, under the watchful eye of a team of CID officers led by Lau Ah Chow (Tay Ping Hui), Lee's former army buddy (and now his bitter rival in love). However, the event is disrupted by the appearance of their comrade Tan Guan Kun (Terence Cao), a fugitive wanted by the authorities for murder, who holds Lee at gunpoint in an act of revenge for the latter's past deeds. An intense standoff ensues as the three brothers (Lee, Lau and Tan) reunite after many years apart.

The story then flashes back to 1985, when the three men are fellow commandos-in-training in the Singapore Army, though hailing from vastly different backgrounds. Lee is the most educated of the trio and aspires to be a lawyer, Lau has a history of confinement in a boy's home due to acts of theft, while Tan is a happy-go-lucky youth obsessed with get-rich-quick schemes. After completing National Service, Lee pursues a career as a lawyer and resorts to ruthless means to cement himself among the elites in the field, in the process exploiting and eventually murdering Tan's love interest Lu Xiuwen (Yvonne Lim), as well as forcefully taking to wife Choo Yu Hang (Wong Li-lin), daughter of top lawyer Steven Choo (Huang Wenyong) and girlfriend of Lau. Lau's outstanding military performance earns him a place in the Special Operations Taskforce, and he goes undercover overseas on a dangerous assignment, during which Choo is deliberately misled and seized by Lee, who thereby earns Lau's enmity. Tan's attempt to create a windfall results in his falling into bad company in the Thai underworld, and he becomes a lethal assassin and drug trafficker. News of Lu's death by Lee further enrages him, and he swears violent revenge. After completing his undercover mission, Lau joins the CID and is tasked with bringing the now-fugitive Tan to justice. In this way, the three brothers-in-arms end up on opposite sides of the law, leading to their final bitter reunion in 1999.

2002 Accolades

External links
Opening theme on YouTube
The Reunion (English)
The Reunion (Chinese)

Singapore Chinese dramas
2000s Singaporean television series
2001 Singaporean television series debuts
2002 Singaporean television series endings
Channel 8 (Singapore) original programming